Gary Webb (born 1973 in Bascombe, Dorset) is a British artist. He makes sculptures out of industrial materials, often achieving comic effects with the use of sound.

He studied at Goldsmiths College between 1994 and 1997.

Exhibitions
Webb's solo debut was an exhibition entitled "Gary Webb plays Gary Webb" at The Approach in 1998. In 2000 he collaborated with Keith Farquhar on a sculptural installation at the Approach, and in 2001 he curated the group show "Brown," for the same gallery.

Webb participated in "Early One Morning", a group exhibition at the Whitechapel Gallery, in 2002. Reviewing the show, Richard Dorment described him as "the most original young artist I've come across in almost 15 years of writing art criticism." His first solo exhibition in a public gallery was at the Chisenhale Gallery in 2004.

Webb's work is in the collection of the Tate.

Education

1997 	BFA Goldsmiths College, London

Solo exhibitions
2012
 Mr. Jeans. deCordova Sculpture Park and Museum, Lincoln, Massachusetts 
2011	
 Kukje Gallery, Seoul, Korea 
2010	
 Key Largo, The Approach, London
2009	
 Other Criteria, London
 Diamond Standard, Bortolami Gallery, New York
2008	
 Euro Bobber, Galeria Parra-Romero, Madrid
 Revolution Oil, The Approach W1, London
 Export, Atelier Hermes, Seoul, Korea
2007	
 Gary Webb, Galerie Nikolaus Ruzicska, Salzburg
2006	
 Gary Webb, Bortolami Dayan, New York
2005	
 Mirage of Loose Change, Kunsthaus, Glarus; Le Consortium, Dijon; Centre d’Arte Contemporain, Geneva
 British Art Show 6, BALTIC The Centre for Contemporary Art, Gateshead, UK
 Still Life – Naturaleza muerta arte contemporaneo britanico y peruano, Museo de Arte de Lima, Lima, Peru
2004	
 Deep Heat T Reg Laguna, The Chisenhale, London, touring to Mead Gallery, Warwick ‘05
 It’s All an Illusion. A Sculpture Project, Migros Museum fur Gegenwartskunst, Zurich, Switzerland
2003	
 Evan Holloway and Gary Webb - Art Statements, Art Basel 34, The Approach London
2002	
 Ringer, MW Projects, London
2000	
 Nouveau Riche with Keith Farquhar, The Approach, London
1998	
 Gary Webb plays Gary Webb, The Approach, London

Commissions

2010	
 Frieze Projects East, London 2012 Festival, London, UK
2009	
 Snowy Farr memorial artwork public commission, City of Cambridge, UK
British Arts Council, Regents Park, London (permanent installation)
2007	
 Anyang Public Art Projecy, Anywang, South Korea
2006	
 Swallow Street, Public sculpture (commissioned by Modus Operandi)
2005	
 Musée des Beaux-Arts de Nancy
 Christian Dior, Dior Homme, Paris (25 Rue Royale)
 Home Office Building (Curated by Liam Gillick)

Publications

2012 'Gary Webb Mr. Jeans' Exhibition catalogue from the 2012 show at deCordova. Paperback, January 1, 2012 

2007 ‘Mirage of Loose Change’, Les Presses Du Réel, Dijon published in 2008 bilingual edition (English / French) 20,5 x 26,2 cm (hardcover) 176 pages (82 colour ill.) 

2005 ‘British Art Show 6’, Hayward Gallery Touring, London

2003	‘The Moderns’, published by Castello di Rivoli Museo d’Arte Contemporanea, Rivoli-Torino

2002	‘Early One Morning’ published by the Whitechapel Art Gallery

2001	‘Tail Sliding’, The British Council
‘Casino 2001: 1st quadrennial of Contemporary Art’, S.M.A.K. Publications

2000	‘The Saatchi Decade’, Booth Clibborn Publications

1999	‘Die Young Stay Pretty’, Catalogue, ICA Publications

Awards
2000	Two year ‘Delfina’ Award for studio space

Public Collections
 TATE Gallery Collection, UK
 Arts Council Collection, UK
 British Council, UK
 Government Art Collection, UK
 S.M.A.K., Gent, Belgium
 Collection Musée départemental d'Art contemporain, Rochechouart, France
 Collection of Fonds regional d'Art contemporain des Pays de la Loire, Carquefou, France

Gallery

References

External links
The Approach: Gary Webb
Bortolami Gallery

1973 births
Living people
British sculptors
British male sculptors
English contemporary artists